Polcirkeln/Svanstein FF is a Swedish football club located in Juoksengi.

Background
Polcirkeln/Svanstein FF (abbreviated Pol/Svanstein FF) was formed in 1993 following the merger of Svansteins SK and IF Polcirkeln. Up to 2001 the club was known as IF Polcirkeln/Svanstein. Polcirkeln/Svanstein FF currently plays in Division 4 Norrbotten Norra which is the sixth tier of Swedish football. They play their home matches at the Svansteins IP in Juoksengi.

The club is affiliated to Norrbottens Fotbollförbund. Polcirkeln/Svanstein FF won the Midnattsolscupen (Midnight Sun Cup) in 2003.

Season to season

Footnotes

External links
 Polcirkeln/Svanstein FF – Official website
 Polcirkeln/Svanstein FF on Facebook

Sport in Norrbotten County
Football clubs in Norrbotten County
1993 establishments in Sweden